Paul Azuka Emordi (born 25 December 1965) is a retired Nigerian athlete who competed in the long jump and triple jump.

His personal best in long jump was 8.25 metres, achieved in June 1987 in Baton Rouge. This ranks him third among Nigerian long jumpers, only behind Yusuf Alli (8.27 m) and Charlton Ehizuelen (8.26 indoor).

Achievements

See also
 List of champions of Africa of athletics

External links
 
 sports-reference

1965 births
Living people
Nigerian male long jumpers
Nigerian male triple jumpers
Athletes (track and field) at the 1984 Summer Olympics
Olympic athletes of Nigeria
African Games gold medalists for Nigeria
African Games medalists in athletics (track and field)
Universiade medalists in athletics (track and field)
Athletes (track and field) at the 1987 All-Africa Games
Universiade silver medalists for Nigeria
World Athletics Indoor Championships medalists
Medalists at the 1987 Summer Universiade
20th-century Nigerian people
21st-century Nigerian people